Donald St Clair Weir (23 January 1900 – 1 April 1959) was a Scottish first-class cricketer and cricket administrator.

Weir was at Edinburgh in January 1900. He was educated at the Edinburgh Academy. A club cricketer for Edinburgh Academical Cricket Club, Weir made his debut for Scotland in first-class cricket against Middlesex at Edinburgh in 1923. He made three further first-class appearances for Scotland, against Wales at Swansea in 1924, and twice against Ireland in 1925 and 1926. He scored 64 runs in his four matches at an average of 9.14, with a highest score of 28. With his right-arm medium pace bowling, he took 5 wickets with best figures of 2 for 63. He later served as president of the Scottish Cricket Union in 1951. 

Outside of cricket, Weir was an accountant and later served as a company director. He was married in 1928 to Aileen Davies, an actress and opera singer. Weir died at Edinburgh in April 1959.

References

External links

1900 births
1959 deaths
Cricketers from Edinburgh
People educated at Edinburgh Academy
Scottish accountants
Scottish cricketers
20th-century Scottish businesspeople
Scottish cricket administrators